The O'Fallon Hoots are a collegiate summer league baseball team in the United States Prospect League. The team played the 2018 and 2019 seasons as the Hannibal Hoots, but only one of those seasons saw them use Hannibal, Missouri as their home; flooding of their stadium led the Hoots to play their 2019 home schedule in nearby Quincy, Illinois at the home stadium of the Quincy Gems. The Hoots formed in late 2017 and were an expansion franchise for the 2018 season. The Hoots and other collegiate summer leagues and teams exist to give top college players professional-like experience without affecting NCAA eligibility.

Rick DeStefane is the sole owner of the Hoots.

The Hoots currently play in the Prospect League's Western Conference in the Prairie Land Division along with the Alton River Dragons, Cape Catfish, and Springfield Lucky Horseshoes.

On September 26, 2019, The Prospect League announced that the franchise would relocate from Hannibal to O'Fallon beginning with the 2020 season, playing their home games at CarShield Field.

History
Hannibal's previous team in the Prospect League, the Hannibal Cavemen, suspended operations after the 2016 season, leaving the city without a team for the 2017 season. The league awarded a new franchise to Rick DeStefane, with the goal of returning to the field for the 2018 season.

For the 2020 season, the Prospect League ceased play due to the COVID-19 pandemic. However, the O'Fallon Hoots played host to a six-team league at CarShield Field, with each team playing 30 game seasons. The CarShield Collegiate League began play on July 1, 2020, with a schedule of 7 inning games.

Stadium
The Hoots play at CarShield Field.

Seasons

Roster

References

External links 
 OFallonHoots.com

Amateur baseball teams in Missouri
Prospect League teams
Baseball teams established in 2017
2017 establishments in Missouri